Glyphodes bitjealis is a moth in the family Crambidae. It was described by Strand in 1920. It is found in Cameroon.

References

Moths described in 1920
Glyphodes